Kalihi is a neighborhood of Honolulu on the island of Oʻahu in Hawaiʻi, United States.  Split by the Likelike Highway (Route 63), it is flanked by downtown Honolulu to the east and Mapunapuna, Moanalua and Salt Lake to the west.

Kalihi is the name of the ahupuaʻa (ancient land division) between Kahauiki and Kapālama in the Kona (now Honolulu) district of O'ahu.  The ahupua'a consists of Kalihi Uka, Kalihi Waena and Kalihi Kai.  Historically, Kalihi Kai was the site of the former Leprosy Receiving Station, where those suspected of leprosy were examined prior to treatment or being sent to Kalaupapa on the island of Molokaʻi.  Kalihi was also known for its fishponds, ʻĀpili, Pahouiki, Pahounui, ʻAuiki, and Ananoho, near the present Sand Island Access Road (Route 64) all of which have since been filled in.  The harbormaster of Kamehameha I, Captain Alexander Adams, maintained a residence near the ʻĀpili pond.
The name comes from ka lihi which means "the edge" in the Hawaiian language, and was used for districts on other islands as well.
It was thought to be named by Prince Lot (the future King Kamehameha V in 1856.

The lower valley has been a residential area for a considerable time and is home to numerous tracts of older houses. It becomes commercial and maritime close to the water.

Kalihi is famous for Pele's family such as her sister, mother, and the wife of Wakea. In this region of Honolulu, they had many adventures: one that she saved Wakea (her husband) "who was being taken away for sacrifice, by embracing him."

Government and infrastructure
The Hawaii Department of Public Safety operates the Oahu Community Correctional Center (OCC), the sole short-term incarceration and pretrial jail, on a  plot in Kalihi.

Education
The Hawaii Department of Education operates public schools.

Some schools in the area include Kalihi Elementary, Kalihi Waena Elementary, Kalihi Uka Elementary, Kalihi Kai Elementary, Dole Middle School, Kapalama Elementary School, King David Kalakaua Middle School, Farrington High School, and Damien Memorial School. At the southern edge of the district lie the private Kamehameha Schools and the Bernice P. Bishop Museum.

People 

 Tulsi Gabbard, politician
Sonny Ganaden, politician
 Mufi Hannemann, politician and businessman
 The Brothers Cazimero, music duo

References

Neighborhoods in Honolulu